The Autonomic Insignia of Distinction is the third highest honor awarded by the Regional Government of Madeira, which “aims to distinguish, in life or posthumously, citizens, communities or institutions that stand out for personal or institutional merits, acts, acts services rendered to the Region ”.

The insignia were established through Regional Legislative Decree n. 21/2003/M of 13 August and regulated by Regional Regulatory Decree n. 9/2004/M of 12 April.

Its attribution is decided by deliberation of the Council of the Regional Government, after receiving proposals of any member of the Regional Government or of any member of the Regional Legislative Assembly.

Purpose 
According to Article 5 of Regional Legislative Decree no. 21/2003/M, the Autonomic Insignia of Valour is to be bestowed to those who:

 Value, honor and dignify the Region at home or abroad, or contribute to it;
 Contribute to the expansion of Madeiran culture or to the knowledge of Madeira and its history and values;
 Contribute to strengthening the affective, cultural and economic ties between all resident and absent Madeira;
 Distinguishe themselves by their dedication to the regional literary, scientific, artistic or sporting cause;
 Are distinguished by their dedication to the cause and services rendered for education and teaching, including communications at national or international congresses or symposia, or similar activities.

Awarding 
The insignia is usually award on the first of July, Madeira's regional holiday.

References 

Madeira Island
Orders, decorations, and medals of Portugal
Awards established in 2003
2003 establishments in Portugal